is a Japanese racing driver. He currently competes in Super GT driving the No. 88 Lamborghini Huracán GT3 Evo for JLOC in the GT300 class.

Career

Formula Three 
Kogure made his single-seater début in 2001, driving a Dallara F300 in the All-Japan Formula Three Championship for Now Motorsports. He finished in eleventh place in the championship standings. The following season, Kogure moved to Mugen*Dome Project and claimed the championship by ten points from Paolo Montin. Kogure won eleven of the season's twenty races, finishing on the podium on a further four occasions. In the non-championship international races, Kogure finished second at the Korea Super Prix behind Olivier Pla, and third at the Macau Grand Prix behind Tristan Gommendy and Heikki Kovalainen.

Super GT 

Kogure made his bow into the All-Japan GT Championship with Nakajima Racing. He contested three races en route to 27th in the championship. After concentrating on Formula Nippon only in 2004, Kogure returned to the newly renamed Super GT championship, with Dome Project in 2005; ending up in nineteenth place in the championship standings. Despite only taking one win in 2006, Kogure and team-mate Ryo Michigami were title contenders, eventually losing out to the crews of André Lotterer and Juichi Wakisaka and also Sébastien Philippe and Shinya Hosokawa. All three pairings were split by four points at the conclusion of the season.

Four pole positions in eight races helped Kogure and Michigami again finish in the top five in the standings in 2007; finishing fourth ahead of Michael Krumm and Tsugio Matsuda on a tie-break as both pairings finished level on 63 points. Sixth place championship placings followed in 2008 and 2009.

In debut season of Honda HSV-010 GT in 2010 Super GT season, Kogure got title of Drivers' Championship with Loïc Duval, and contributed to get Team's Championship by Weider Honda Racing.

Formula Nippon 
As well as his JGTC campaign, Kogure took part in the Formula Nippon series with Nakajima. He finished tenth in the championship, taking a best result of second at the closing race of the season at Suzuka. He took his first series victory during the 2004 season, finishing out front at the season-opening round, again at Suzuka. He made a further visit to the podium at Sugo en route to seventh in the standings. He improved to fifth place in 2005, despite not winning any races.

Kogure moved to Aguri Suzuki's ARTA team for the 2006 campaign, and again failed to win any races during the season. He only amassed three points towards the championship, but also amassed five pole positions. Despite this, he returned to Nakajima Racing in 2007, taking three victories on the way to his highest championship placing in Formula Nippon; third position behind Team Impul team-mates Matsuda and Benoît Tréluyer. He finished fifth again in 2008, and fourth in 2009 as well as 2010.

Formula One 
As a member of Honda's Formula Dream Project, Kogure had the opportunity to test a Honda RA107 Formula One car at Circuit Ricardo Tormo in January 2008.

Racing record

Career summary

Racing record

Complete Formula Nippon/Super Formula results 
(Races in bold indicate pole position)

Complete Super GT results 

* Season still in progress

References

External links 

 Official website
 Career statistics from Driver Database

1980 births
Living people
Sportspeople from Kanagawa Prefecture
Japanese racing drivers
Formula Nippon drivers
Super GT drivers
Japanese Formula 3 Championship drivers
Super Formula drivers
Team Kunimitsu drivers
Mugen Motorsports drivers
Nakajima Racing drivers
Team Aguri drivers
21st-century Japanese people
B-Max Racing drivers